Biphase or Bi-phase may refer to:
 Biphase modulation, or binary phase-shift keying
 Differential Manchester encoding, also known as Aiken biphase or biphase mark code
 Harvard biphase, used to encode data onto magnetic tape
 Mu-Tron Bi-Phase, a musical effects device

See also 
 Biphasic (disambiguation)